Deniz Uğur (born October 17, 1973) is a Turkish film actress, script writer and dubbing artist.

Early life and family
Deniz Uğur is the single child of opera singer Mete Uğur and ballerina Suna Uğur. The chamberlain of Sultan Abdulhamid II, İhsan Bey, was the father of her grandmother Saliha Hanım, and her grandparent Nadir Bayer was raised under the auspices of Naime Sultan, the daughter of Sultan Abdulhamid II in Ottoman palace. She is also related to Keriman Halis Ece and David Bennent.

She is a mother of three children named Engin Deniz, Mina Deniz and Poyraz Deniz.

Education and career
She graduated from Istanbul University Conservatory of Ballet Department, after taking the examinations of higher education and graduated in 1995. Before graduation, she played lead role on Görünmeyen Dostlar with Şükran Güngör and Kadriye Kenter in Kenter Theatre, and began the professional theatre career. She drew attention with French Comedy Çetin Ceviz by playing lead role with Cihan Ünal and Nevra Serezli. In 1997, at Ankara Movie Fest, with owing the role in Bir Erkeğin Anatomisi she has been awarded as Promising Actress.

After her long break on cinema and theater, through leading with Engin Alkan on Huysuz Musical, she became a candidate on Afife Awards although without musical branch.

In 2015, she was applauded by Yıldız Kenter and Haldun Dormen for her leading performance on Guguk Kuşu with Oktay Kaynarca.

She is also a columnist, script writer, songwriter and novel-writer.

Filmography

2023, Cenazemize Hoş Geldiniz - Nevin
2023, Demir Kadın: Neslican (movie) - Fatma Tay
2022, Bir Peri Masalı (series) - Figen Kileci
2021–2022, Böru 2039 (series) - Almila Erk
2021, Kırmızı Oda (series) - Azra
2019–2020, Zalim İstanbul (series) - Seher Yılmaz                                                                              
2018, İnsanlık Suçu (series) - Emel Gökdemir
2017–2018, Kırgın Çiçekler (Series) - Macide
2017, Bir Deli Sevda (series) - Alev
2017, Hep Yek 2 (movie) - Aslı
2015–2016, Kung Fu Panda (movie – dubbing: Angelina Jolie "Tigress")
2015–2016 Frankenstein (theatre)
2015 Guguk Kuşu (theatre)
2015, Aşk Zamanı (movie) -Reyhan
2015, Kara Kutu (movie) - Canan
2015, Detay (movie) - Duygu
2013–2014, Umutsuz Ev Kadınları (series, Turkish version of Desperate Housewives) - Gülşah Taşdelen
2014, Gulyabani (movie) - Güneş
2013–2014 Huysuz Müzikali (theatre)
2012 Adını Feriha Koydum Emir'in Yolu (series) - Sanem Ilhanli
2012 Pamuk Prenses ve Avcı (movie – dubbing: Charlize Theron "Queen")
2012 Bu Son Olsun (movie) - Nimet
2011 Kung Fu Panda (movie – dubbing: Angelina Jolie "Tigress")
2011 Adını Feriha Koydum (series) - Sanem Ilhanli
2008 Kung Fu Panda (movie – dubbing: Angelina Jolie "Tigress")
2008 Paramparça Aşklar (series)
2007 Baba Oluyorum (series)
2007 Ertelenmiş Hayatlar (series)
2006 Hayatım Sana Feda (series)
2006 Sahte Prenses (series)
2005 Yağmur Zamanı (series)
2004 Zümrüt (series)
2001–2002 Benimle Evlenir Misin? (series)
2001 Bana Şans Dile (series)
2000 Mert Ali 1-2 (TV film)
2000 Yalan Dünya (series)
1999 Kurtlar Sofrası (series)
1998 Güldüren Cazibe (series)
1996 Bir Erkeğin Anatomisi (movie)
1995 Çetin Ceviz (theatre)
1993 Yaz Evi (serie)
1993 Görünmeyen Dostlar (theatre)

References

1973 births
Living people
Turkish film actresses
Turkish television actresses
Turkish voice actresses
Actresses from Ankara
Istanbul University alumni
Turkish people of Swiss descent